Sarnajdani (also Romanized as Sarnajdānī) is a village in Abtar Rural District, in the Central District of Iranshahr County, Sistan and Baluchestan Province, Iran. At the 2006 census, its population was 393, in 79 families.

References 

Populated places in Mehrestan County